Tight junction protein ZO-3 is a protein that in humans is encoded by the TJP3 gene.

Interactions 

TJP3 has been shown to interact with tight junction protein 1.

References

Further reading